This is a list of diplomatic missions of Bolivia, excluding honorary consulates.

Due to strained relations with Chile, Bolivia only has Consulates-General in Chile.

Africa

 Cairo (Embassy)

Americas

 Buenos Aires (Embassy)
 Córdoba (Consulate)
 Jujuy (Consulate)
 La Quiaca (Consulate)
 Mendoza (Consulate)
 Orán (Consulate)
 Pocito (Consulate)
 Rosario (Consulate)
 Salta (Consulate)
 Viedma (Consulate)

 Brasilia (Embassy)
 Rio de Janeiro (Consulate-General)
 São Paulo (Consulate-General)
 Brasiléia (Consulate)
 Cáceres (Consulate)
 Corumbá (Consulate)
 Guajará-Mirim (Consulate)

 Ottawa (Embassy)

 Santiago (Consulate-General)
 Arica (Consulate-General)
 Antofagasta (Consulate)
 Calama (Consulate)
 Iquique (Consulate)

 Bogotá (Embassy)

 San José (Embassy)

 Havana (Embassy)

 Quito (Embassy)

 Mexico City (Embassy)

 Managua (Embassy)

 Panama City (Embassy)

 Asunción (Embassy)

 Lima (Embassy)
 Cusco (Consulate)
 Ilo (Consulate)
 Puno (Consulate)
 Tacna (Consulate)

 Washington, D.C. (Embassy)
 Los Angeles (Consulate-General)
 Miami (Consulate-General)
 New York City (Consulate-General)
 Houston (Consulate)

 Montevideo (Embassy)

 Caracas (Embassy)

Asia

 Beijing (Embassy)

 New Delhi (Embassy)

 Tehran (Embassy)

 Tokyo (Embassy)

 Seoul (Embassy)

 Ankara (Embassy)

Europe

 Vienna (Embassy)

 Brussels (Embassy)

 Paris (Embassy)

 Berlin (Embassy)

 Rome (Embassy)

 Rome (Embassy)
 Milan (Consulate-General)

 The Hague (Embassy)

 Moscow (Embassy)

 Madrid (Embassy)
 Barcelona (Consulate-General)
 Bilbao (Consulate)
 Murcia (Consulate)
 Seville (Consulate)
 Valencia (Consulate)
 Palma de Mallorca (Vice-Consulate)

 Stockholm (Embassy)

 Geneva (Embassy)

 London (Embassy)

Multilateral organizations
 Brussels (Mission to the European Union)
 Geneva (Permanent Mission to the United Nations and international organizations)
 Montevideo (Permanent Mission to ALADI and MERCOSUR)
 New York (Permanent Mission to the United Nations)
 Paris (Permanent Mission to UNESCO)
 Rome (Permanent Mission to FAO)
 Washington, D.C. (Permanent Mission to the OAS)

Gallery

Closed missions

Americas

Asia

Europe

See also
 Foreign relations of Bolivia
 List of diplomatic missions in Bolivia
 Visa policy of Bolivia

Notes

References

Bolivian Ministry of Foreign Affairs 

 
Bolivia
Diplomatic missions